Maurício Alves Destri (born 3 September 1991) is a Brazilian actor.

Filmography

Television

Film

Video clips

Theater

Awards & Nominations

References

External links 

1991 births
Living people
People from Criciúma
Brazilian people of Italian descent
Brazilian male television actors
Brazilian male film actors
Brazilian male stage actors
21st-century Brazilian male actors